J. N. Santaeulàlia, Josep Navarro Santaeulàlia (Banyoles, Girona; 1955) is a Catalan writer and poet.

Biography 
Josep Navarro Santaeulàlia, whose name is always stated as J. N. Santaeulàlia on his books, was born in 1955 in Banyoles, Girona, where he still lives with his family. He is a poet, essayist, novelist and translator. His first publication was a poetry book, Memòries de la carn (Memories of the flesh). The author has been awarded with the Prize for Essays Crítica Serra d'Or 1991, with the Novel Award Crítica Serra d'Or 2000 and the Premi Columna 2002, also for a novel, among others.

Publications 
 Memòria de la carn, poetry, Columna, Barcelona 1987
 Questió de mots: del simbolisme a la poesia pura, essay, La Magrana, Barcelona 1989
 Objectes perduts, stories, La Magrana, Barcelona 1990
 La llum dins l'aigua, poetry, Columna, Barcelona 1996
 Una ombra a l'herba, poetry, Moll, Majorca 1998
 Fusions, poetry, La Magrana, Barcelona 1997
 Terra negra, novel, Proa, Barcelona 1996
 Bulbs, novel, La Magrana, Barcelona 1999
 L'absent, novel, La Magrana, Barcelona 1999
 Pagodes i gratacels, travel narrative, Columna, Barcelona 2001
 Ulls d'aigua, novel, Columna, Barcelona 2002
 Punt mort, novel, Columna, Barcelona 2005
 Yume, novel, La Magrana, Barcelona 2007
 La sorra vermella, novel, Proa, Barcelona, 2017

Translations by the author 
 Marea baixa. Haikus de primavera i d'estiu, Haikus (from Japanese to Catalan), La Magrana, Barcelona 1997
 Marea Baixa, Haikus de les quatre estacions, Haikus (from Japanese to Catalan), www.amazon.es, 2015

External links 
Information about the writer J. N. Santaeulàlia (in Catalan)
Enjoc about the book Pagodes i gratacels (in Catalan) 

1955 births
Living people
People from Pla de l'Estany
Catalan-language writers
Writers from Catalonia
Teachers of Catalan